Donna Cockayne (born 26 March 1989) is an Australian football (soccer) player who last played for Australian W-League team Adelaide United. She worked as a nurse alongside her football career.

References 

1989 births
Living people
Australian women's soccer players
Adelaide United FC (A-League Women) players
Women's association football midfielders